"Someone's Daughter" is a song by Beth Orton, released as her fourth single, found on her 1996 release Trailer Park. It contains 3 songs, and was released on C.D. and vinyl. The release peaked at #49 in the UK official singles chart.

Track listing

CD: Heavenly / HVN 65CD United Kingdom 
 "Someone's Daughter" - 3:37
 "I Wish I Never Saw The Sunshine" - 4:45
 "It's This I Am I Find" - 3:49

Beth Orton songs
1997 singles
Heavenly Recordings singles
1997 songs